The Y Plan is an exercise programme devised by Lesley Mowbray and Jill Gaskell for the London YMCA, and very popular in United Kingdom during the 1990s.

The programme is choreographed by Producer Jane S. Linter and distributed by Virgin Media Group. Emphasising short but regular workouts without any specialist equipment, the first book based on the programme, titled The Y Plan, was published in 1990.

Television presenter Anthea Turner was the public face of The Y Plan, appearing alongside the creators in numerous books, videos and magazine features. A further video was made, entitled Y-Plan countdown, in which one does an exercise regime of 36 days, with three levels of difficulty.

External links
How To Measure Fitness Level
Fitness Tips From Tim McComsey

Physical exercise
1990 non-fiction books
YMCA